Jennie Hansen is a Latter Day Saint (LDS) fiction author whose publications include newspaper and magazines articles, news stories, editorials, short stories, reviews of other LDS author's work, and twelve novels. She also is a frequent speaker at firesides, conferences, and literary groups.

Hansen was born in Idaho Falls, Idaho, and was first published at the age of seven. She received an associate degree from Ricks College (now BYU-Idaho). She is also a graduate with a BA from the Westminster College in Salt Lake City, Utah. Her past occupations have been an editor and newspaper reporter for a weekly newspaper and occasionally wrote articles for a daily newspaper. She worked for the Utah State Legislature before being currently employed as the circulation specialist for the Salt Lake City Public Library system.

Some of the awards that she has received include many journalism rewards. The National Federation of Press Women's second place was awarded to her for editing the Valley View News (1978). She also was awarded third place for the Contemporary for Some Sweet Day, Heart of the West 1997 Writers Contest.

Bibliography 

Abandoned
All I Hold Dear
Beyond Summer Dreams
Breaking Point
Chance Encounter
Code Red
Coming Home
Emerald
High Stakes
Macady
Some Sweet Day
The Bracelet
Wild Card

References

External links 
 Official website

American Latter Day Saint writers
Year of birth missing (living people)
Living people
Brigham Young University–Idaho alumni
Westminster College (Utah) alumni
American women novelists
Novelists from Idaho
People from Idaho Falls, Idaho
Latter Day Saints from Idaho
Latter Day Saints from Utah
American women non-fiction writers